"When Doves Cry" is a song by American musician Prince, and the lead single from his sixth studio album Purple Rain. According to the DVD commentary of the film Purple Rain (1984), Prince was asked by director Albert Magnoli to write a song to match the theme of a particular segment of the film that involved intermingled parental difficulties and a love affair. The next morning, Prince had composed two songs, one of which was "When Doves Cry". According to Prince's biographer Per Nilsen, the song was inspired by his relationship with Vanity 6 member Susan Moonsie.

"When Doves Cry" was Prince's first Billboard Hot 100 No. 1 single, staying there for five weeks, and was also a worldwide hit. According to Billboard, it was the top-selling single of 1984. It is certified Platinum by the Recording Industry Association of America (RIAA). It was the last single released by a solo artist to receive a Platinum certification before the certification requirements were lowered in 1989. "When Doves Cry" was ranked number one on the Billboard Year-End Hot 100 singles of 1984. Following Prince's death, the song re-charted on the Billboard Hot 100 chart at number eight, its first appearance in the top 10 since the week ending September 1, 1984.

The music video, directed by Prince, premiered on MTV in June 1984. It opens with white doves emerging from double doors to reveal Prince in a bathtub, then shows him performing the song in various scenes. The video sparked controversy among network executives, who thought that its sexual nature was too explicit for television. "When Doves Cry" is ranked number 37 on Rolling Stone's list of the 500 Greatest Songs of All Time and is included in The Rock and Roll Hall of Fame's 500 Songs that Shaped Rock and Roll. According to Acclaimed Music, it is the 31st most celebrated song in popular music history.

Background and composition 
Prince wrote and composed "When Doves Cry" after all the other tracks were complete on Purple Rain. In addition to providing vocals, he played all instruments on the track. The song's texture is remarkably stark. There is no bass line, which is very unusual for an '80s dance song; Prince said that there originally was a bass line but, after a conversation with singer Jill Jones, he decided that the song was too conventional with it included. The song features an intro of a guitar solo and a Linn LM-1 drum machine, followed by a looped guttural vocal. After the lyrics, there is another, much longer, guitar and synthesizer. The song ends on a classical music-inspired keyboard piece backed by another synthesizer solo. Keyboardist Matt Fink revealed in 2014 that the baroque synthesizer solo was recorded by Prince at half speed and an octave lower against a half-speed backing track, then sped up to create the final version. Fink was then tasked to learn and perform the solo at the album's speed.

On versions edited for radio, either the song fades out as the long guitar and synthesizer solo begins, or the solo is eliminated altogether and the song skips to the ending with Prince's harmonizing and classical finish.

During live performances of the song on the Purple Rain Tour, Prince's bass player Brown Mark added bass lines to the song as well as to other songs without bass lines.

The song is in the key of A minor.

Reception
In its contemporary review of the song, Cash Box said that "featuring ethereal lyrics, a pounding backbeat and a sometimes ominous musical atmosphere, this single again proves Prince to be one of the most provocative and sophisticated artists in the business. ."

"When Doves Cry" was No. 1 in the US for five weeks, from July 7, 1984, to August 4, 1984, keeping Bruce Springsteen's "Dancing in the Dark" from reaching the top spot. Because of tabulation differences, the song was announced as the year's No. 2 single on the American Top 40 year-end countdown (with "Say Say Say" at No. 1). The song was voted as the best single of the year in The Village Voice Pazz & Jop critics' poll. Billboard ranked it as the No. 1 year-end single of 1984. In 2016, after Prince's death, "When Doves Cry" re-entered the Billboard Hot 100 at No. 20, peaking at No. 8. It also ranked No. 1 on the Billboard Hot Black Singles chart for eight weeks (from June 30, to August 18, 1984), preventing Tina Turner's "What's Love Got to Do With It" from reaching the top spot for five of those weeks.

The B-side was the cult fan favorite "17 Days", which was originally intended for Apollonia 6's self-titled album. A 12-inch single issued in the UK included "17 Days" and two tracks from Prince's previous album, 1999: its title track and "D.M.S.R.". The entire title of "17 Days (the rain will come down, then U will have 2 choose, if U believe, look 2 the dawn and U shall never lose)" is now the longest-titled flip side of a Hot 100 No. 1, with 85 letters and/or numbers.

"When Doves Cry" became one of Prince's signature songs. Spin magazine ranked "When Doves" the No. 6 song of all time.
 In 2021, Rolling Stone ranked "When Doves Cry" No. 37 on its list of "The 500 Greatest Songs of All Time". In 2006, VH1's "The 100 Greatest Songs of the '80s" ranked the song at No. 5. On October 13, 2008, the song was voted No. 2 on Australian VH1's Top 10 Number One Pop Songs countdown. The "80 of the 80s" podcast ranks it as the No. 59 song of the decade. In 2016, Paste ranked the song number three on their list of the 50 greatest Prince songs, and in 2022, American Songwriter ranked the song number two on their list of the 10 greatest Prince songs.

According to Acclaimed Music, it is the 31st most celebrated song in popular music history.

"When Doves Cry" was sampled for use in MC Hammer's 1990 hit song, "Pray", one of the few samples of his songs legally sanctioned by Prince.

Music video
The music video (directed by Prince himself) was released on MTV in June 1984. It opens with white doves emerging from double doors to reveal Prince in a bathtub. It also includes scenes from the Purple Rain film interspersed with shots of The Revolution performing and dancing in a white room. The final portion of the video incorporates a mirrored frame of the left half of the picture, creating a doubling effect. The video was nominated for Best Choreography at 1985's MTV Video Music Awards. The video sparked controversy among network executives, who thought that its sexual nature was too explicit for television.

Track listing
 7-inch single: Paisley Park / 0-20170 (US)
 "When Doves Cry" – 3:47
 "17 Days (The rain will come down, then U will have 2 choose. If U believe, look 2 the dawn and U shall never lose.)" – 3:54

 12-inch single: Warner Bros. / W9286T (UK)
 "When Doves Cry" – 5:52
 "17 Days (The rain will come down, then U will have 2 choose. If U believe, look 2 the dawn and U shall never lose.)" – 3:54

 "1999" – 6:22
 "D.M.S.R." – 8:05

 2×12" pack
 CD single 1989
 "When Doves Cry"
 "Purple Rain" (album version)

Personnel
 Prince – lead vocals, background vocals, lead guitar, synthesizers, synthesizer solo, guitar solo, Linn LM-1 drum machine

Charts and certifications

Weekly charts

Year-end charts

All-time charts

Certifications

Awards and nominations
 American Music Awards – 1985 – Favorite Black Single (won)
 Pazz & Jop critics' poll: best single of the year, 1984 (won)

Ginuwine version

A cover version by American singer Ginuwine was produced by Timbaland and released on July 25, 1997, for Ginuwine's album The Bachelor; Ginuwine's cover uses actual dove sound effects as texture for the song. The official music video for this version was directed by Michael Lucero.

Charts

Year-end charts

Notable cover versions
 As a child, American actor and singer Quindon Tarver covered the song for the 1996 film Romeo + Juliet. It was included on the soundtrack album William Shakespeare's Romeo + Juliet: Music from the Motion Picture, Volume 2, and became a number 3 hit in Australia in July 1997.
After Prince's death in 2016, Choir! Choir! Choir! covered "When Doves Cry" with 1999 people, a tribute to the 1999 album. It was recorded and filmed in Toronto's Massey Hall.
Nonpoint held an online voting bracket competition in 2020 where fans voted for their next cover song, in which "When Doves Cry" by Prince was the winner. The band released the cover song in September 2021.
UK comedian and actor, Lenny Henry, made a parody video of the song back in the 1980s.

See also
List of Billboard Hot 100 number-one singles of 1984

Notes

References

Sources
 Uptown: The Vault – The Definitive Guide to the Musical World of Prince: Nilsen Publishing 2004, 

1984 singles
1997 singles
Prince (musician) songs
Songs written by Prince (musician)
Music videos directed by Prince (musician)
Ginuwine songs
Billboard Hot 100 number-one singles
Cashbox number-one singles
Funk songs
Music videos directed by Michael Lucero
Number-one singles in Australia
RPM Top Singles number-one singles
Song recordings produced by Timbaland
Guy Sebastian songs
Warner Records singles
Epic Records singles
Song recordings produced by Prince (musician)
1984 songs
Songs written for films
Songs about fathers
Music video controversies
Experimental pop songs
Neo-psychedelia songs
Avant-pop songs
American soul songs